Jackeline Rodríguez Streffeza (born January 12, 1972) is a Venezuelan model and beauty queen who was the official representative of her country to the 1991 Miss Universe pageant held in  Las Vegas, Nevada on May 17, 1991, where she was one of Top 6 finalists. Rodríguez was not a titleholder of the Miss Venezuela pageant. That year, the 1991 Miss Venezuela pageant was moved to September, thus taking place after the 1991 Miss Universe pageant. Rodríguez was ultimately chosen by Osmel Sousa to represent Venezuela at Miss Universe.

References

External links
Miss Venezuela Official Website
Miss Universe Official Website

1972 births
Living people
Miss Universe 1991 contestants
Venezuelan beauty pageant winners
Venezuelan people of Italian descent